Mourtala Diakité (born 1 October 1980, in Bamako) is a Malian former professional footballer who played as a defensive midfielder.

Honours
Cercle Olympique
Malien Cup: 2000, 2002

Shandong Luneng
Chinese Super League: 2010

Benfica Luanda
Taça de Angola: 2014

1° de Agosto
Girabola: 2016

External links

1980 births
Living people
Sportspeople from Bamako
Malian footballers
Association football midfielders
CO de Bamako players
Primeira Liga players
Liga Portugal 2 players
S.C. Beira-Mar players
Boavista F.C. players
C.F. Os Belenenses players
C.S. Marítimo players
Liga I players
FC Dinamo București players
Chinese Super League players
China League One players
Shandong Taishan F.C. players
Guangdong Sunray Cave players
Girabola players
S.L. Benfica (Luanda) players
C.D. Primeiro de Agosto players
Mali international footballers
Malian expatriate footballers
Expatriate footballers in Portugal
Expatriate footballers in Romania
Expatriate footballers in China
Expatriate footballers in Angola
Malian expatriate sportspeople in Portugal
Malian expatriate sportspeople in China
Malian expatriate sportspeople in Romania
21st-century Malian people